This list of gold mines in Canada is subsidiary to the list of mines article and lists working, defunct and future mines in the country. For practical purposes, defunct and future mines are demarcated in italics and bold respectively. Asterisks (*) note mines which produce(d) gold as a secondary product..

British Columbia

New Brunswick

Nova Scotia

Ontario

Quebec

Northwest Territories

Nunavut

References 

 
 Gold
Canada